István Pintér (born 21 August 1961) is a Hungarian water polo player. He competed in the men's tournament at the 1988 Summer Olympics.

References

External links
 

1961 births
Living people
Hungarian male water polo players
Olympic water polo players of Hungary
Water polo players at the 1988 Summer Olympics
People from Szolnok
Sportspeople from Jász-Nagykun-Szolnok County